Papan Panjabi (10 June 1928 – 25 February 2018) was an Indian cricket umpire. He stood in seven Test matches between 1978 and 1981 and two ODI games in 1982.

See also
 List of Test cricket umpires
 List of One Day International cricket umpires

References

1928 births
2018 deaths
Place of birth missing
Indian Test cricket umpires
Indian One Day International cricket umpires